Aksenovo is a rural locality (a village) in Staroselskoye Rural Settlement, Vologodsky District, Vologda Oblast, Russia. The population was 10 as of 2002.

Geography 
Aksenovo is located 32 km southwest of Vologda (the district's administrative centre) by road. Opuchkovo is the nearest rural locality.

References 

Rural localities in Vologodsky District